Killer or killers is a multi-player folk variant of straight pool in which each player is assigned a set number of "lives" and takes one shot per  to attempt to  a ball, or else lose a life. Usually if the player  then an additional life is lost. It is a popular pub game because it can involve a potentially unlimited number of players, and offers the opportunity for each player to bet a small amount of money for a reasonable return in winner-takes-all. The game is sometimes called killer pool.

Killer pool is the main game subject of the Side Pocket video game series.

References

Pool (cue sports)